Particularly Important Task is a 1980 Soviet drama film directed by Yevgeny Matveev.

Plot 
The film tells about the employees of a large aircraft factory, who even in the evacuation did not stop the production of aircraft.

Cast 
 Evgeniy Matveev
 Valeriya Zaklunnaya
 Lyudmila Gurchenko
 Nikolay Kryuchkov
 Vladimir Samoylov
 Pyotr Chernov		
 Gennadiy Yukhtin	
 Yevgeny Kindinov	
 Yevgeni Lazarev
 Lev Borisov

References

External links 
 

1980 films
1980s Russian-language films
Soviet drama films
1980 drama films